Osaris is a personal digital assistant (PDA) featuring the EPOC operating system (OS) distributed by Oregon Scientific.

The Osaris contains an 18.432 MHz CL-PS7111 (ARM 710) processor and is powered by two AA size batteries or an external power 6 volt AC adapter, with a 3 volt CR2032 cell providing backup power. The liquid-crystal display (LCD) is a touchscreen, backlit 320 × 200 pixels with 16 greyscale levels. There are also 10 membrane keys, 5 on each side of the LCD.
The Osaris can be linked to a PC via an RS-232 link cable and IrDA (Infrared).
The Osaris contains 8 MB of read-only memory (ROM), and, depending on the model, 4 MB, 8 MB or 16 MB random-access memory (RAM). The memory can also be expanded using CompactFlash. 
 Dimensions: 170 × 90 × 20 mm
 Weight: c. 250 g
The Osaris is the only PDA to use the EPOC release 4 operating system. It also has the distinction of being the first device to run EPOC (later renamed Symbian OS) that was not built by Psion. It is very similar in ability to the Psion Series 5.
The Osaris comes with these programs preinstalled:

 Agenda: For appointments, things to do, birthdays, anniversaries
 Data: For names, addresses, or other database use
 Jotter: For making quick notes
 Time: For alarms
 Calc: For simple or scientific calculations
 World: Shows a map, world times, dialling codes
 Word: For writing documents, letters
 Sheet: For tables, spreadsheets, graphs
 Program: Editor for writing computer programs

Personal digital assistants
Personal information managers
Computer-related introductions in 1999